Ninja Gaiden is a 1990 adaption of the 1988 arcade game for the Atari Lynx under license from Tecmo.

Gameplay
Ninja Gaiden is a side-scrolling action game in which the player controls a trainee ninja that must enter the sacred silent city in his quest to destroy the darkness and restore order. The ninja can jump, punch, kick and use weapons. The enemy opponents come in the form of: masked ninja, lumberjack ninja, clawed warrior, dark lord, black ninja, sumo wrestler and white ninja. The final boss is known as the dark lord who uses razor-sharp sabres. The game is on a timer where the player has 99 seconds to complete each level. If the player fails to complete the level in that time the player loses a life. There are a number of power-ups and treasures in the game from extra time to swords. There is also a scoring system of points for each enemy killed.

Reception

IGN's Robert A. Jung said that the story was irrelevant and that the game was a scaled down version of the arcade original. He praised the graphics, but in his final verdict he wrote that "Ninja Gaiden is not a bad game; it's just not a good game, either", giving a final score of 7 out of 10. In its August 1991 issue, CVG magazine's Rob Swan said the game was exactly the same as the arcade coin-op. He felt the game was a little short of superb but really addictive, giving the game a score of 89 out of 100. Raze magazine's Les Ellis gave a score of 91%.

References

1990 video games
Atari Lynx games
Atari Lynx-only games
Tecmo games
Ninja Gaiden games
Platform games
Side-scrolling video games
Single-player video games
BlueSky Software games
Video games developed in the United States